"Tomorrow's (Just Another Day)" is a song by British band Madness from their fourth album The Rise & Fall. It spent 9 weeks in the UK charts, peaking at # 8 in February 1983. It was released as a double A-side with the Chris Foreman composition, "Madness (Is All in the Mind)".

The single version is a slight remix of the album track. A slower, blues-style version of the song, with Elvis Costello on vocals, was included as a bonus track on the 12" single. The latter version was later included as a bonus track on the 2004 2-disc reissue of Costello's Goodbye Cruel World album.

1983 singles
Madness (band) songs
Songs written by Chas Smash
Songs written by Mike Barson
Song recordings produced by Clive Langer
Song recordings produced by Alan Winstanley
1982 songs
Stiff Records singles